The Archdeacon of Derby is a senior ecclesiastical officer in the Church of England Diocese of Derby. The archdeacon has responsibility for church buildings and clergy discipline in her/his archdeaconry – the Archdeaconry of Derby – which roughly covers the southern half of Derbyshire.

History
The first mentions of an archdeacon in the area occurred in the twelfth century – around the time when archdeacons' posts were first being created across England. From that earliest point until the Victorian reorganisations of church structures, the archdeaconry was in the Diocese of Lichfield (which during those seven centuries was called Coventry, Coventry & Lichfield, Lichfield & Coventry and Lichfield). The archdeaconry, at that point covering the whole county of Derby, was transferred by Order in Council to the new Diocese of Southwell on 5 February 1884 and then split on 18 October 1910 – creating the Chesterfield archdeaconry – such that it now covers roughly the southern half of Derbyshire. On 7 July 1927, the Diocese of Derby was created from the two Southwell archdeaconries of Derby and of Chesterfield.

List of archdeacons

High Medieval
bef. 1139–aft. 1140: G.
: Richard (disputed)
–aft. 1167: Froger
: N.
–aft. 1182: Godfrey de Luci
bef. 1191–aft. 1191: Yvo
bef. 1199–aft. 1199: Vivian de Stagno
bef. 1206–aft. 1231: William de Muschamp
bef. 1238–aft. 1254: William de Luteby
bef. 1256–aft. 1261: David de Sancta Frideswida
bef. 1263–aft. 1263: William de Weston
bef. 1278–aft. 1278: Simon
bef. 1279–aft. 1281: Jordan de Wymburne
bef. 1281–July 1311 (d.): Elias de Napton

Late Medieval
17 December 1311–February 1328 (d.): Geoffrey de Blaby or Glaston
15 March 1328–bef. 1338 (d.): Anthony de Monte Peliologo
23 February 1339–bef. 1351 (d.): John de Asheby
19 August 1351 – 1353 (res.): John de Marisco
26 November 1353–bef. 1361 (d.): Hugh de Marisco
17 October 1361 – 24 December 1369 (exch.): Robert de Stretton
24 December 1369–bef. 1381 (d.): William Lombe
15 November 1381 – 14 January 1418 (d.): John de Outheby
bef. 1428–1431 (res.): Walter Bullock
2 September 1431 – 23 May 1473 (exch.): John Bride
23 May 1473–bef. 1485: William Chauntre
12 October 1485 – 8 May 1501 (d.): Edmund Hals
bef. 1506–1515 (res.): Nicholas West
9 March 1516–bef. 1533 (res.): John Taylor (also Master of the Rolls
from 1527 and Archdeacon of Halifax from 1528)
April 1533–7 January 1543 (d.): Richard Strete

Early modern
8 January 1543 – 1557 (res.): David Pole (also Archdeacon of Salop)
November 1558 – 1559 (deprived): John Ramridge (also Dean of Lichfield)
November 1559–September 1567 (d.): Richard Walker (also Archdeacon of Stafford)
17 September 1567 – 1576 (d.): Laurence Nowell (also Dean of Lichfield)
29 July 1577 – 1587 (d.): Luke Gilpin
March 1588–23 November 1590 (rem.): Walter Marsh
23 November 1590 – 1 June 1603 (d.): John Walton
9 June 1603–bef. 1609: Valentine Overton
1609–bef. 1617: Christopher Helme
4 December 1617–bef. 1641 (d.): Samuel Clerk
1641–bef. 1666 (d.): William Higgins
bef. 1666–1689 (res.): Thomas Brown (or Browne)
7 August 1689–bef. 1704 (d.): Francis Ashenhurst
14 December 1704–bef. 1719 (d.): Thomas Goodwin
24 September 1719 – 19 April 1755 (d.): Henry Ryder
5 May 1755–bef. 1769 (d.): Sneyd Davies
3 February 1769 – 28 February 1795 (d.): Henry Egerton
10 March 1795 – 25 April 1809 (d.): James Falconer
12 May 1809 – 7 February 1821 (d.): Edmund Outram
24 February 1821 – 1836 (res.): Samuel Butler
9 September 1836 – 5 May 1840 (res.): Francis Hodgson
30 December 1840 – 1847 (res.): Walter Shirley
11 January 1847 – 18 April 1873 (res.): Thomas Hill

Late modern
The archdeaconry became part of the Southwell diocese on 5 February 1884.
1873–29 November 1891 (d.): Edward Balston
1891–1900 (res.): Henry Freer
1900–1909 (res.): Edward Were
Since 7 July 1927, the archdeaconry has been in the Diocese of Derby.
1909–1943 (ret.): Edward Noakes (afterwards archdeacon emeritus)
1943–1952 (ret.): Henry FitzHerbert (afterwards archdeacon emeritus)
1952–1973 (ret.): John Richardson (afterwards archdeacon emeritus)
1973–1992 (ret.): Robert Dell (afterwards archdeacon emeritus)
1993–2005 (ret.): Ian Gatford
29 April 200631 December 2020 (ret.): Christopher Cunliffe
1 January 2021present (acting): Peter Walley

Notes

References

Sources

Lists of Anglicans
 
Lists of English people
Diocese of Derby